Anacronicta is a genus of moths of the family Noctuidae.

Species
Anacronicta caliginea (Butler, 1881)
Anacronicta flavala (Moore, 1867)
Anacronicta fuscipennis (Warren, 1912)
Anacronicta infausta (Walker, 1856)
Anacronicta horishana Matsumura, 1931
Anacronicta nitida (Butler, 1878)
Anacronicta obscura (Leech, 1900)
Anacronicta okinawensis Sugi, 1970
Anacronicta pallidipennis (Warren, 1912)
Anacronicta plumbea (Butler, 1881)

External links

Pantheinae